Graphium codrus is a butterfly of the family Papilionidae, that is found in the Philippines, Celebes and Solomon Islands.

References
Page M. G.P & Treadaway,C. G.  2003 Schmetterlinge der Erde, Butterflies of the world Part XVII (17), Papilionidae IX Papilionidae of the Philippine Islands. Edited by Erich Bauer and Thomas Frankenbach Keltern: Goecke & Evers; Canterbury: Hillside Books.  
Racheli, Tommaso, 1979 New subspecies of Papilio and Graphium from the Solomon Islands, with observations on Graphium codrus (Lepidoptera, Papilionidae). Zoologische Mededelingen 54 (15): 237–240, 1 plate pdf
Vane-Wright, R. I., & R. de. Jong. 2003. The butterflies of Sulawesi: annotated checklist for a critical island fauna. Zoologische Verhandlingen 343: 1–267 pdf

Codrus
Butterflies described in 1777